Paco Goyoaga (16 May 1920 – 25 May 1980) was a Spanish equestrian. He competed at the 1956 Summer Olympics, the 1960 Summer Olympics and the 1964 Summer Olympics.

References

1920 births
1980 deaths
Spanish male equestrians
Olympic equestrians of Spain
Equestrians at the 1956 Summer Olympics
Equestrians at the 1960 Summer Olympics
Equestrians at the 1964 Summer Olympics
Sportspeople from Madrid